The Codex Vindobonensis B 11093 (Code of the Austrian National Library at Vienna) is an anonymous fechtbuch of 46 pages of drawn illustrations only, with no text, dating to the mid 15th century, probably created in southern Germany. It has been grouped together with the "Gladiatoria" fechtbuch, forming a "Gladiatoria group" outside the mainstream of Johannes Liechtenauer's school.

Further reading 
 Streitberg, W., Die Gotische Bibel (Heidelberg, 1965)

External links
 Anonymous, Untitled - Cod 11093, c1450
15th-century illuminated manuscripts
Combat treatises
Manuscripts of the Austrian National Library